Lorenzo Perrone (born 26 September 1981) is a former Italian male middle-distance runner who won two national titles at senior level and that in 2003 ranking in 24th place at the end of season in the World list of the 3000 metres indoor, thanks to this good performance he participated at the 2003 IAAF World Indoor Championships.

Biography
He was 10th at the 2002 European Athletics Championships in Munich in the final of the 1500 metres. He also participated at two editions of the IAAF World Cross Country Championships (2001, 2004) at individual senior level.

Achievements

National titles
He won two national championships at individual senior level.
Italian Indoor Athletics Championships
3000 metres: 2003
Italian Cross Country Championships
Short race: 2001

References

External links
 

1981 births
Living people
Italian male middle-distance runners
Athletics competitors of Fiamme Gialle
Sportspeople from Palermo
Italian male cross country runners
Athletes (track and field) at the 2001 Mediterranean Games
Mediterranean Games competitors for Italy